In mathematical logic, formation rules are rules for describing which strings of symbols formed from the alphabet of a formal language are syntactically valid within the language. These rules only address the location and manipulation of the strings of the language. It does not describe anything else about a language, such as its semantics (i.e. what the strings mean). (See also formal grammar).

Formal language

A formal language is an organized set of symbols the essential feature being that it can be precisely defined in terms of just the shapes and locations of those symbols. Such a language can be defined, then, without any reference to any meanings of any of its expressions; it can exist before any interpretation is assigned to it—that is, before it has any meaning. A formal grammar determines which symbols and sets of symbols are formulas in a formal language.

Formal systems 

A formal system (also called a logical calculus, or a logical system) consists of a formal language together with a deductive apparatus (also called a deductive system). The deductive apparatus may consist of a set of transformation rules (also called inference rules) or a set of axioms, or have both. A formal system is used to derive one expression from one or more other expressions. Propositional and predicate calculi are examples of formal systems.

Propositional and predicate logic 
The formation rules of a propositional calculus may, for instance, take a form such that;

 if we take Φ to be a propositional formula we can also take Φ to be a formula;
 if we take Φ and Ψ to be a propositional formulas we can also take (Φ   Ψ), (Φ   Ψ), (Φ   Ψ) and (Φ   Ψ) to also be formulas.

A predicate calculus will usually include all the same rules as a propositional calculus, with the addition of quantifiers such that if we take Φ to be a formula of propositional logic and α as a variable then we can take (α)Φ and (α)Φ each to be formulas of our predicate calculus.

See also
Finite state automaton

References 

Formal languages
Propositional calculus
Predicate logic
Rules
Syntax (logic)
Logical truth